Ján Geleta (born 13 September 1943) is a former Slovak football player.

Geleta played his whole professional league career for Dukla Prague. He appeared in 283 league matches and scored 27 goals. Geleta was initially at Dukla to serve his two-year military service. After finishing his military duties, he stayed at the club and played there until 1976.

Geleta won the Czechoslovak First League twice with Dukla, in 1964 and 1966. He also won the Czechoslovak Cup with Dukla in 1965, 1966 and 1969. In 1967, he was voted the Czechoslovak Footballer of the Year.

Geleta was a member of the Czechoslovakia national football team and played for his country total 19 matches, scoring two goals. He also participated in the 1964 Summer Olympics in Tokyo, where the Czechoslovak team won the silver medals.

External links
 Profile at Hall of Fame Dukla Praha website 
 Profile at ČMFS website

1943 births
Living people
Slovak footballers
Czechoslovak footballers
Czechoslovakia international footballers
Olympic footballers of Czechoslovakia
Olympic silver medalists for Czechoslovakia
Olympic medalists in football
Footballers at the 1964 Summer Olympics
Medalists at the 1964 Summer Olympics
Dukla Prague footballers
People from Partizánske
Sportspeople from the Trenčín Region
Association football midfielders